Sohran may refer to:

 Soran Emirate
 Sohran, Iran (disambiguation)